Anti-sp100 antibodies are found in association with primary biliary cirrhosis. The autoimmune target of anti-sp100 is the sp100 nuclear antigen which was identified by its association with primary biliary cirrhosis. 20-30% of patients with primary biliary cirrhosis have sp100 Abs. The sera of these patients exhibit a characteristic "nuclear dots" pattern in indirect immunofluorescence (IIF) on Hep-2 cells.

Immunodominant regions of sp100

 Antigenic region 1 - positions 296-311 - Sequence (I K K E K P F S N S K V E C Q A)
 Antigenic region 2 - positions 332-351 - Sequence (E G S T D V D E P L E V F I S A P R S E)
(Bolded areas represent the core epitope.)

References

Autoantibodies
PBC autoantibodies